Neil Nixon is an author, journalist and academic from Workington, England. Nixon's published works include titles on the paranormal, popular music, football and two novels published under the name of Stanley Manly. In 1999, he founded the United Kingdom's first full-time higher education course in Professional Writing. Nixon's scripts include material for television and radio. His radio play Mr. Lennon was nominated for a Sony Radio Academy Award for Best Single Drama.

Career
Nixon is a published journalist and was a regular contributor to the Fortean Studies series of books produced by Fortean Times magazine. Nixon's work for the series included papers exploring UFOlogy from the perspective of social science. In his paper in Fortean Studies Volume 6 called "They're Not all Lunatics on the Fringe", Nixon examined the meaning and fulfillment experienced by members of UFO cults. His book UFOs contained a chapter called "Astounding Tales" that cited four cases, including 1976 Tehran UFO incident, as a challenge to all UFO skepticism.

Stories 
Nixon's comedy and fiction writing includes material for many of the UK's leading adult humour comics including Viz, Gas, Brain Damage and Poot!. He has also published two novels under the name of Stanley Manly. The first of these, Raiders of the Low Forehead, was published in 1999 and was one of the first three offerings of Attack! Books. According to a review on Spank the Monkey, the work was "less of a novel than a series of sketches with the slightest of narrative threads holding them together: all short punchy chapters, full of crap puns, relentless internal rhymes and blatantly obvious storytelling." Nixon's next novel, Workington Dynamo, was published in 2008 and follows a more formal structure. The book was noted by 3:AM Magazine to be "a hetero love story for a grrl as well as the soccer club, and his wimmin are a violent counter blast to the rich, thin tory-sucking anti-feminists that currently seem to think that fat poor people shouldn't be allowed to live. Young Dougie Grimton is after his cousin Kerry and the result is a sweet but tangy element amidst the picaresque madness."

Courses 
In 1999, Nixon led the developments for the UK's first full-time higher education course in Professional Writing, a programme he continues to lead. A radio play Nixon wrote called Mr. Lennon was broadcast in 2001. The play imagines the life of John Lennon if The Beatles had failed to secure a record deal. Mr. Lennon was later nominated for a Sony Radio Academy Award for Best Single Drama.

References

Selected bibliography

Stanley Manly

Neil Nixon

External links

British male writers
Living people
Year of birth missing (living people)
People from Workington
British journalists